Juillan is a commune in the Hautes-Pyrénées department in south-western France.

Air Méditerranée has its head office on the property of Tarbes–Lourdes–Pyrénées Airport, in Juillan.

Population

Notable people
 

Denis Jourdanet (1815–1892), physician and physiologist

See also

Communes of the Hautes-Pyrénées department

References

Communes of Hautes-Pyrénées